The 41st British Academy Film Awards, given by the British Academy of Film and Television Arts in 1988, honoured the best in film for 1987.

Winners and nominees

Statistics

See also
 60th Academy Awards
 13th César Awards
 40th Directors Guild of America Awards
 1st European Film Awards
 45th Golden Globe Awards
 8th Golden Raspberry Awards
 2nd Goya Awards
 3rd Independent Spirit Awards
 14th Saturn Awards
 40th Writers Guild of America Awards

References 

Film041
BAFTA
1988 in British cinema
1987 awards in the United Kingdom